Majeed Jahangir (born 3 December 1980) is a Pakistani former cricketer. He played first-class cricket for several domestic teams in Pakistan between 1998 and 2014. He was also a part of Pakistan's squad for the 1998 Under-19 Cricket World Cup.

References

External links
 

1980 births
Living people
Pakistani cricketers
Zarai Taraqiati Bank Limited cricketers
Gujranwala cricketers
Sialkot cricketers
Cricketers from Sialkot